Ernest Alfred "Ernie" Whittam (7 January 1911 – 1951) was a professional footballer who played for Huddersfield Town, Chester, Mansfield Town, Wolverhampton Wanderers and Bournemouth & Boscombe Athletic. He was born in Wealdstone.

References

1911 births
1951 deaths
English footballers
Footballers from Harrow, London
Association football forwards
English Football League players
Huddersfield Town A.F.C. players
Chester City F.C. players
Mansfield Town F.C. players
Wolverhampton Wanderers F.C. players
AFC Bournemouth players